Rubrobacter marinus is a Gram-positive bacterium from the genus of Rubrobacter which has been isolated from deep-sea sediments from the South China Sea.

References

Rubrobacterales
Bacteria described in 2020